Paul Schiller (born 1899, date of death unknown) was a Romanian footballer who played as a striker.

International career
Paul Schiller played in the first official match of Romania's national team, a 2–1 victory against Yugoslavia at the 1922 King Alexander's Cup. He also played in a friendly against Czechoslovakia which ended with a 4–1 loss.

Honours
Chinezul Timișoara
Divizia A: 1921–22, 1922–23, 1923–24, 1924–25

References

External links
 

1899 births
Year of death missing
Romanian footballers
Romania international footballers
Place of birth missing
Association football forwards
Liga I players
Chinezul Timișoara players